Ruth Davis or Ruth Davies may refer to:

Bette Davis (1908–1989), American actress née Ruth Davis
Ruth A. Davis (born 1943), American diplomat
Ruth Davis (1926–1970), American gospel singer with The Davis Sisters
Ruth M. Davis (1928–2012), American computer scientist and civil servant
Ruth Davies (born 1965), English actress known professionally as Rudi Davies
Ruth Davis (basketball) (born 1994), Canadian basketball player (née Ruth Hamblin)